Centrolepis drummondiana is a species of plant in the Restionaceae family and is found in Western Australia.

It blooms between September and November.

It is found among granite outcrops,  growing amongst mosses and in wet areas in the Mid West, Wheatbelt, South West, Great Southern and Goldfields-Esperance regions of Western Australia where it grows in sandy-clay soils.

References

drummondiana
Plants described in 1849
Flora of Western Australia
Poales of Australia